In enzymology, a creatinase is an enzyme that catalyzes the chemical reaction

creatine + H2O  sarcosine + urea

Thus, the two substrates of this enzyme are creatine and H2O, whereas its two products are sarcosine and urea.

The native enzyme was shown to be made up of two subunit monomers via SDS-polyacrylamide gel electrophoresis. The molecular weights of these subunits was estimated to be 47,000 g/mol. The enzyme works as a homodimer, and is induced by choline chloride. Each monomer of creatinase has two clearly defined domains, a small N-terminal domain, and a large C-terminal domain. Each of the two active sites is made by residues of the large domain of one monomer and some residues of the small domain of the other monomer. It has been suggested that a sulfhydryl group is located on or near the active site of the enzyme following inhibition experiments. Creatinase has been found to be most active at pH 8 and is most stable between ph 6-8 for 24 hrs. at 37 degrees.

This enzyme belongs to the family of hydrolases, those acting on carbon-nitrogen bonds other than peptide bonds, specifically in linear amidines.  The systematic name of this enzyme class is creatine amidinohydrolase. This enzyme participates in arginine and proline metabolism.

Structural studies

References

 

EC 3.5.3
Enzymes of known structure